The Copa del Rey  1919 was the 19th staging of the Copa del Rey, the Spanish football cup competition.

The competition started on 12 April 1919, and concluded on 18 May 1919, with the final, held at the Martínez Campos in Madrid, in which Arenas Club de Getxo lifted the trophy for the first time ever with a 5–2 victory over FC Barcelona after extra-time with a hat-trick from Félix Sesúmaga.

Teams
Biscay: Arenas Club de Getxo
Gipuzkoa: Real Sociedad
 Centre Region: Racing de Madrid
 South Region: Sevilla FC
Galicia: Real Vigo Sporting
Asturias: Sporting de Gijón
Catalonia: FC Barcelona
Levante: CD Águilas

Quarterfinals

First leg

Second leg

Arenas Club de Getxo and Racing de Madrid won one match each. At that year, the aggregate score was not taken into account. A replay match was played.

Sporting de Gijón and Real Vigo Sporting tied, with both games drawn. A replay match was played.

FC Barcelona won 2–0 on aggregate matches and qualified for the semifinals.

Replay matches

Arenas Club qualified for the semifinals.

Real Vigo qualified for the semifinals.

Bye: Sevilla FC

Semifinals

First leg

Second leg

FC Barcelona win 2–0 on aggregate matches.

Arenas Club de Getxo win 2–0 on aggregate matches.

Final

Notes

References

External links 
RSSSF.com
Linguasport.com

1919
1919 domestic association football cups
1918–19 in Spanish football